Teach For India (TFI) is a non-profit founded by Shaheen Mistri in 2009. It is a part of the Teach For All network. Teach For India runs a two-year Fellowship and supports an Alumni movement. The Fellowship recruits college graduates and working professionals to serve as full-time teachers in low-income schools for two years. The mission of Teach For India is “one day all children will attain an excellent education.”

History 
In 2006, the founder of Teach For India Shaheen Mistri, 17 years after starting the Akanksha Foundation felt compelled to address the issue of educational inequity at a larger scale. She believed that the solution was a people's movement that needed to come in unison to provide every Indian child with an outstanding education.

In 2007, Shaheen Mistri met with Wendy Kopp, the Founder of Teach For America, and the ideation process to keep ‘leadership’ at the core was ignited.

In 2009, Teach For India welcomed the first cohort, the Class of 2009, to the Fellowship. The 87 ‘Niners’ formed the beginning of a nationwide movement of diverse leaders.

In 2011, two years later, the Niners graduated from the Fellowship and became the first cohort in Teach For India's Alumni movement. The first cohort of Alumni then went on to work in several pathways such as teaching, teacher training, school leadership, and government policy solving the complex problem of educational equity.

Today, Teach For India has 900 Fellows working relentlessly to change the lives of Students in their classrooms and have become leaders driving change. Now, the organization has over 3400 Alumni who are collectively fuelling the larger movement towards their vision.

Geographical Reach

Mumbai 
In the year 2009, the first cohort of the Teach For India Fellowship began in Mumbai and Pune with 87 Fellows. In 2011, they graduated with 46 Fellows and 1122 Students.

In the year 2015, The Alumni movement grew bigger. The city of Mumbai started to steadily grow its Alumni network from 43 Alumni in 2011 to 280 in 2015. ‘321’ was Mumbai's first Alumni led organization.

In the year 2020, Teach For India Mumbai collaborated with MCGM. Teach For India's partnership with the government evolved over the years from being a mere service provider to reaching out to Teach for India for advice and collaborating on projects like training MCGM staff, Student Advisory Council, and best practice sharing.

The recent numbers for 2021 shows that 144 Fellows, 3500 Students, and 860 Alumni members are in the city of Mumbai.

Pune 
In 2009, the first cohort began in Pune with 87 Fellows. In the year 2011, Pune's first cohort graduated with 32 Fellows and 1100 Students.

In 2018, Pune received Secondary Education Access to English-medium secondary classrooms, which was a huge challenge for Pune's kids. This issue was addressed through the PPP model partnerships with Aakanksha Foundation and iTeach Schools.

The recent numbers indicates that Pune has 145 Fellows, 6500 Students, and 840 Alumni members.

Ahmedabad 
In the year 2014, Teach For India reached Ahmedabad and had its first cohort with 34 Fellows and 1,100 Students. The Samait Shala was founded by a 2014 Ahmedabad Fellow, Kushal Dattani. The organization, Samait Shala trains teachers directly to ensure that classrooms are inclusive of students who learn in different ways and at different paces.

In 2016, they started operations in 20 schools in Ahmedabad with 80 Fellows and 2,000 Students. The elementary Students in the state were known to outperform on every single metric when it came to the mastery of basic operations and reading. Teach For India was above the state and city averages for both the learning techniques.

The recent data for 2021 have indicated 47 Fellows, 1800 Students, and 230 Alumni members in Ahmedabad.

Bengaluru 
In the year 2015, Teach For India had its first cohort with 57 Fellows and 2,182 Students in Bengaluru.

In 2016, The community centers emerged. To solve contextual challenges, Fellows across the city set up community centers to facilitate additional learning time and Student-run community interventions.

The recent data for 2021 have indicated 120 Fellows, 3500 Students, and 270 Alumni members in Bengaluru.

Chennai 
In 2012 Teach For India had its first cohort with 32 Fellows and 660 Students in Chennai.

In 2017, Teach For India focused on Student leadership opportunities in Chennai. Students visited NASA, participated in Young Entrepreneurs Academy and TEDx.

In 2018, Teach For India partnered up with the government of Tamil Nadu. The Alumni worked as consultants for the Tamil Nadu Education Department to develop the state Education Information Management System and Digital Content Platforms for all teachers and students in the state.

The recent numbers for 2021 show that there are 110 Fellows, 3600 Students, and 370 Alumni members in Chennai.

Delhi 
In 2011, Teach For India had its first cohort in Delhi with 65 Fellows and 2000 students.

In the year 2016, 1000+ student leaders started driving change in the city. A Student leader Jyoti started project Gurukul inviting Students to conduct workshops in art and spoken word poetry for other students, hoping to build respect for arts and artists in the community.

By the year 2017, 30+ Delhi organizations were founded by Teach For India Alumni in the sectors of early childhood education and parent empowerment.

The recent numbers for 2021 have indicated 260 Fellows, 9000 Students, and 880 Alumni members in Delhi. Delhi is Teach For India's biggest regional operation.

Hyderabad 
In 2012, Teach For India had its first cohort in the city of Hyderabad with 46 Fellows and 1800 Students.

In the years between 2014 and 2015, the Fellow Durbar was inaugurated. The Fellow Durbar initiative is an organic space for people to come together and share their experiences and is now an integral part of Teach For India's ecosystem across 7 cities.

The recent numbers for 2021 have indicated 87 Fellows, 3250 Students, and 430 Alumni members in Hyderabad.

Teach For India Model 
Teach For India has a short term theory of change and a long term theory of change. In the short term, Teach For India follows a two-year Fellowship model. Their Fellows’ through the course of two years of teaching and working with key education stakeholders, are exposed to the realities of India's education system. The Fellows, in these years, cultivate the knowledge, skills, and mindsets required to achieve positions of leadership in and beyond education. In the long term theory of change, Fellows who graduate from the Fellowship join the Alumni movement.

The model for the Fellowship starts with a selective recruitment and selection process, followed by an ongoing teacher training and leadership development, after which Teach For India measures the impact of Students and the leadership growth of Fellows.

Each Fellow is assigned a classroom in one of Teach For India's placement cities to teach academics, values, mindsets and to give Students the access and exposure they require to reach their personal, long-term visions. Post-Fellowship, they join the Alumni movement that's working across various pathways for a more equitable India.

The long-term vision for Teach For India’s Fellows 

 The Commitment to Personal Transformation: Exploring who you are, your purpose, and striving to be a better person.
 The Commitment to Collective Action: Building relationships and organizing partners to multiply and deepen our impact.
 The Commitment to Educational Equity: Deepening our understanding of educational equity and committing to attaining it.

Fellows work on these commitments in and beyond the full-time lab of their classroom, where they relentlessly focus on moving their Students towards “path-changing” learning, the highest level of our Student Vision Scale. By growing in the 3 commitments, and embedded with real-life leadership experiences in the classroom and communities, Fellows are ready to be lifelong learners and leaders for greater impact on children.

In the next stage, Fellows either start their organizations or hold key positions of leadership, both within and beyond the education sector.

The Impact 
Teach For India in a decade has seen more than 120,000 young people applying to the Fellowship Program. Currently, the non-profit organization has 900+ Fellows impacting over 3,2000 students in 260 under-resourced schools in India. They have 5,200 Student Alumni. Since Teach For India's inception, they have infused the system with more than 3,400+ Alumni who are running their own schools, organizations, training teachers, designing policy, and continuing to serve within classrooms, non-profits, and corporate institutions.

The Teach For India Alumni is serving more than 33 million children; 1 in 10 Indian children is now reached by a Teach For India Alumni. More than 77% of their Alumni continue to serve in the social sector. A recent study shows that Teach For India's community has founded more than 150+ organizations.

Teach For India has built a national focus on repairing India's educational crisis through their Innovation Cell programs that equip teachers, students, and entrepreneurs to spark long-term change in education. Through social and print media- Teach For India has garnered the support of thousands of people from a wide range of sectors, all of whom are invested in the vision of an excellent education for all children.

Academic Impact 
Teach For India has graduated 3 cohorts of 5,200 students from 10th grade in Mumbai, Pune, and Delhi till 2019 with a graduation rate that is consistently better than the Government schools’ average. Their 4th cohort graduated in 2020 with a passing rate of 94-98% across these three cities Mumbai, Pune, and Delhi.

Math 
Teach For India's students are learning to recall, apply knowledge and skills appropriate to their level. This has led to 36% grade-level mastery of Math at the end of the year versus 20% at the beginning of the year in 2018–19.

Reading Comprehension 
Teach For India students showed a record of 0.6 years of growth in their reading level in 2018–19, achieving a higher level of reading.

Alumni

Notable Teach For India alumni 

 Ashish Srivastava, 2009 Cohort, Shiksharth
 Aniket Thukral 2009 Cohort, Director of Programs, Global School Leaders
 Daniel Lobo, 2009 Cohort, Director, Leaders’ Quest
 Madhukar Banuri, 2009 Cohort, Leadership For Equity
 Charag Krishnan, 2009 Cohort, Partner, McKinsey and Company
 Yash Kumar, 2009 Cohort, GenYMedium
 Gaurav Singh, 2009 Cohort, 321 Education Foundation
 Rahul Gupta, 2009 Cohort, Pune Children's Zone 
 Namita Goel, 2009 Cohort, Lead School
 Shalini Datta, 2010 Cohort, AfterTaste
 Mayank Lodha, 2010 Cohort, KPMG India
 Sriram Chemuturi, 2010 Cohort, Principal, Matshori English Medium School
 Divya Behl, 2010 Cohort, Programme Manager, Global Schools Forum
 Aniket Doegar, 2010 Cohort, co-founder and CEO, Haqdarshak
 Kaushik Ananthanarayana, 2010 Cohort, Analytical Lead and Industry Manager, Google India
 Nisha Subramaniam, 2010 Cohort, Kanavu 
 Alpana Mallick, 2011 Cohort, Director, Training and Impact, Teach For India
 Lewitt Somarajan, 2011 Cohort, CEO, Life Lab
 Jagnoor Grewal, 2011 Cohort, Punjab Civil Services, Govt. of Punjab
 Kimberly Fernandes, 2011 Cohort, Joint Ph.D. in Human Development/Quantitative Methods (Education) and Anthropology, University of Pennsylvania
 Kimberly Fernandes, 2011 Cohort, Ph.D. Candidate, Education (Human Development) and Anthropology, University of Pennsylvania
 Hemakshi Meghani, 2011 Cohort, Indian School of Democracy
 Arja Dayal, 2012 Cohort, Former Country Director of Sierra Leone and Liberia, Innovations for Poverty Action
 Dipti Balwani, 2012 Cohort, Program Lead, Saturday Art Class; Transformational Teaching Fellowship Fellow
 Aaditya Tiwari, 2012 Cohort, Officer on Special Duty to the CM of Arunachal Pradesh
 Nathaniel Seelan, 2013 Cohort, ASL, Vidyaniketan, Chennai
 Ankita Nayak, 2013 Cohort, JP Morgan and Chase
 Jasmine Sachdev, 2013 Cohort, Shiv Nadar School, Aagaaz Theatre Trust 
 Sarthak Satapathy, 2013 Cohort, Former Team Lead, DIKSHA-PMU, Central Square Foundation
 Anurag Kundu, 2013 Cohort, Senior Officer, Govt. of Delhi 
 Jasmeet Walia, 2013 Cohort, Creatnet Education
 Priyanka Agrawal, 2013 Cohort, Engagement Manager, McKinsey and Company
 Ananya Shekar, 2013 Cohort, Thrive Foundation 
 Varun Prasad, 2013 Cohort, For A Smarter Tomorrow Foundation
 Pooja Chopra, 2013 Cohort, Khwaab
 Abhiram Natarajan, 2014 Cohort, Lead, 1M1B
 Mahesh Medlari, 2014 Cohort, People & Culture, Openhouse
 Aditya Krishnan, 2014 Cohort, Teach For India
 Kushal Dattani, 2014 Cohort, Founder, Samait Shala
 Hari Haran, 2014 Cohort, MBA, INSEAD
 Rahul Balakrishnan, 2014 Cohort, co-founder, Arthan
 Dhruv Gupta, 2014 Cohort, Consultant - Global Education Practice, The World Bank
 Surabhi Venkatesh, 2014 Cohort, Director, People & Culture, Heads Up For Tails
 Prasanna Sundaram, 2014 Cohort, Augmented Understanding 
 Piyush Gupta, 2015 Cohort, Manager, Policy Support, Ministry of Electronics and Information Technology
 Sharmili Phulgirkar, 2015 Cohort, Vice President, Citi, Singapore 
 Shefali Mishra, 2015 Cohort, Manager, Partnerships, Harappa Education
 Ramya Krishnan, 2015 Cohort, Team Lead, Central Square Foundation
 Tanvi Metre, 2015 Cohort, Founding Team Member and Manager, iTeach Schools
 Jahnavi Reddy, 2015 Cohort, The News Minute
 Mrinalika Rathore Project Lead, Sashaktikaran Foundation, 2015 Cohort
 Aaran Patel, 2015 Cohort, Master of Public Policy, Social and Urban Policy, Harvard Kennedy School
 Leena Bhattacharya, 2015 Cohort, Ph.D. in economics, Indira Gandhi Institute of Development Research, Mumbai
 Ankita Nawalakha, 2015 Cohort, The New Education Project
 Abhijit Thakur, 2016 Cohort, MBA, Indian School of Business
 Leeja Pillai, 2016 Cohort, Campaign Strategy, Indian Political Action Committee (I-PAC) 
 Satyam Gupta, 2016 Cohort, VP, Untangle
 Sruti Sriram, 2016 Cohort, Teacher, Avasara Academy
 Vishal Sharma, 2016 Cohort, Founder, SMILES in Life Foundation
 Atul Sahu, 2016 Cohort, General Manager, Aditya Birla Chemicals
 Ketaki Patil, 2016 Cohort, Ummeed 
 Sana Sohoni, 2017 Cohort, Avasara Academy
 Benoy Stephen, 2016 Cohort, Y-Ultimate
 Alamelu Kathiresan, 2016 Cohort, Math Love 
 Vatsala Misra Sharma, 2017 Cohort, Masters of Education in Human Development and Psychology, Harvard Graduate School of Education
 Manu Gupta, 2017 Cohort, MBA, Saïd Business School, University of Oxford
 Shekar Hariharan, 2017 Cohort, Founder, Shifting Orbits Foundation
 Shreya Krishnan, 2017 Cohort, co-founder, The Better Design Foundation
 Sivaram Renganathan, 2017 Cohort, City Director, Reap Benefit
 Sneha Shetty, 2017 Cohort, Avasara Academy
 Sowmya Lakshminarayanan, 2017 Cohort, Founder, Lead by Design
 Shitanshu Maurya, 2017 Cohort, Business Analyst, Egon Zehnder

References

Non-profit organisations based in India
Educational organisations based in India
Organisations based in Mumbai
Organizations established in 2007
2007 establishments in Maharashtra